Bene may refer to:

 Bene AG, a European office furniture product and services company
 Bene Israel ("Sons of Israel") are a historic community of Jews in India
 Bene (Crete), a town of ancient Crete, Greece
 a prefix denoting a society in the fictional world of Dune, among them:
 Bene Gesserit
 Bene Tleilax

Places
Bene, a rural municipality in Zakarpattia Oblast, Ukraine

People
Mononym
 Bené, Brazilian footballer
 Benee, New Zealand singer

Surname
Carmelo Bene, Italian actor, poet, film director and screenwriter
 Ferenc Bene, Hungarian footballer

See also
 Behne, a surname
 Beni (disambiguation)
 Bani (disambiguation)
 Adriana Ferrarese del Bene or Del Bene ( - after 1804), Italian operatic soprano